Grandmaster Chess is a 1992 video game to play chess for DOS and Macintosh developed by IntraCorp and its subsidiary Capstone that was focused on neural network technology and an artificial intelligence (AI) able to learn from mistakes.

Capable of using VGA and SVGA modes, features multiple skill levels, different sets of pieces, boards and backgrounds, 2D/3D view, pull-down menus, move list with VCR style control, able to analysis moves and games and rate the user strength. Originally it was distributed in floppy disks, but in 1993 in appeared in CD-ROM. This release only relevant addition was the Terminator 2: Judgment Day: Chess Wars package, an animated chess set like Battle Chess video game representing the Terminator 2: Judgment Day movie.

Reception
Computer Gaming World stated that Grandmaster Chess "falls short of the current competition in terms of overall options". The magazine criticized the game's weak strategic analysis reporting, the absence of an advertised teaching mode, and a weak opening book.

See also
 Computer chess
 Vintage software
 Learning section of Artificial Intelligence article
 Simulators for teaching neural network theory section of Neural network software article

References

External links

Applications of artificial intelligence
Chess software
DOS games
Classic Mac OS games
1992 video games
Video games developed in the United States
IntraCorp games
Multiplayer and single-player video games